The Men's 100 Breaststroke event at the 11th FINA World Aquatics Championships swam 24 and 25 July 2005 in Montreal, Quebec, Canada. Preliminary and semifinal heats were swum 24 July; finals on July 25.

At the start of the event, the existing World (WR) and Championships (CR) records were:
WR: 59.30 swum by Brendan Hansen (USA) on July 8, 2004 in Long Beach, USA
CR: 59.78 swum by Kosuke Kitajima (Japan) on July 21, 2003 in Barcelona, Spain

Results

Final

Semifinals

Preliminaries

References

Swimming at the 2005 World Aquatics Championships